Gurgumakhi (Dargwa: Гьургьумахьи) is a rural locality (a selo) in Musultemakhinsky Selsoviet, Levashinsky District, Republic of Dagestan, Russia. The population was 538 as of 2010. There are 4 streets.

Geography 
Gurgumakhi is located 28 km southwest of Levashi (the district's administrative centre) by road. Musultemakhi and Allate are the nearest rural localities.

Nationalities 
Dargins live there.

References 

Rural localities in Levashinsky District